Tahona is a style of Afro-Cuban music.

Tahona, tajona or taona may also refer to:

Tahona (from Arab aṭṭaḥúna), a traditional Spanish flour mill or bakery
Tahona, a village in Kachin State, Burma
Tajona, a small whip used in Nicaraguan dances
Schrankia taona, a species of moth